Mustapha Pa Safa Sama (born 31 October 1979 in Freetown) is a Sierra Leonean former soccer player.

Career

Early career in Africa
Pa Safa was born and raised in Wellington, a poor neighbourhood in the east end of Freetown. He started his football career with his hometown club Wellington People in 1996 as a 17-year-old, and would later go on to play for several clubs in the Sierra Leone National Premier League, including Wusum Stars, Ports Authority and East End Lions, with whom he won the Sierra Leone National Premier League in 1999.

Sama also played for Algerian side JS Kabylie and Cape Verdean team Boavista prior to his move to Europe.

Global nomad
Sama was signed by Swedish club Vasalund/Essinge IF in 2000, initiating a trip across the second divisions of Europe, playing for FK Haugesund in the Norwegian Adeccoligaen, Charleroi in the Belgian First Division, and Syrianska FC in Sweden. Sama was controversially terminated by Charleroi in 2005 after a dispute over the payment of match bonuses.

Sama moved to his third continent – Asia – in 2006 to play for LG-ACB Ha Noi in the Vietnamese V-League, moved to Indonesia to play for Persija Jakarta in 2007, and then moved west to play for Al-Wahda in Syria in 2008.

Sama then took on his fourth continent – North America – in March 2009 when he signed for the Carolina RailHawks in the USL First Division.  After failing to get clearance to transfer to Carolina, Sama briefly went on trial with the San Jose Earthquakes.

References

External links
 

Living people
1979 births
Sportspeople from Freetown
Temne people
R. Charleroi S.C. players
Expatriate footballers in Vietnam
FK Haugesund players
Expatriate footballers in Sweden
Expatriate footballers in Syria
Sierra Leonean footballers
Expatriate footballers in Norway
Sierra Leonean expatriates in the United States
Expatriate footballers in Indonesia
Sierra Leonean expatriate sportspeople in Sweden
Sierra Leonean expatriate sportspeople in Norway
Syrianska FC players
Vasalunds IF players
Boavista FC (Cape Verde) players
Ports Authority F.C. players
Association football defenders
Sierra Leone international footballers
Sierra Leonean expatriate footballers
Expatriate footballers in Algeria
Expatriate footballers in Cape Verde
Expatriate footballers in Belgium
Expatriate footballers in Thailand
East End Lions F.C. players
JS Kabylie players
Hà Nội FC (1956) players
Persija Jakarta players
Al-Wahda SC (Syria) players
North Carolina FC players
Mustapha Sama
Belgian Pro League players
Norwegian First Division players
Syrian Premier League players
Wusum Stars players